Upper Rissington is a village and civil parish in the Cotswold district of Gloucestershire, England. It is located about two-and-a-half miles east of Bourton-on-the-Water and is one of the highest villages in the Cotswolds at an elevation of 275 m.  The village is on the former site of the Central Flying School and the airfield is still the active RAF site of RAF Little Rissington. 

According to the Gloucestershire Mid-2004 Ward and Parish Population Estimates it had a population of 994.  According to the Local Insight Profile it had a population of 1040 in 2014 but this has since grown rapidly due to the new housing.  The village is one of the youngest and most dynamic communities in the Cotswolds with 30% of the population under 18  Once famed for its social life in the old ballroom when it housed hundreds of young trainee pilots, the new village is now well known locally for community events such as its firework displays.

Local amenities
A mini shopping mall has been constructed as part of the new development which includes a MidCounties Co-operative Society shop, Badham's Pharmacy, Runner Bean gym and a Barnado's charity shop. In 2019 what was the original Co-operative shop re-opened as Dragon Vets. There is also a village hall, a primary school, tennis courts, football pitches and many green spaces around the village. The village is within the catchment of the Cotswold School "the Comprehensive School of the Year 2015/16" according to the Sunday Times.

Governance
The village has its own Parish Council.  The village is the most populous area of the 'Rissingtons' district council electoral ward. This ward starts in the south at Great Rissington and stretches north to Icomb. The total population taken at the 2011 census was 2,103.  The village is in the Stow-on-the-Wold county council electoral division and is one of the three largest population centres, along with Stow and Moreton-in-Marsh.

References

External links

 Upper Rissington Parish Council

Villages in Gloucestershire
Cotswold District